The Savoia-Marchetti SM.92 was an Italian heavy fighter/bomber of World War II based on the Savoia-Marchetti SM.88. The SM.92 did away with the mid-wing crew nacelle. The crew of two sat in the left fuselage only. Two DB 605 engines were fitted.

Armament consisted of three 20 mm MG 151 cannon, two in the mid-wing and one in the right fuselage, and five 12.7 mm machine guns, two under each engine , and one remotely controlled in the tail. A bombload of up to 2,000 kg (4,400 lb) could be carried under the inner wing, and 160 kg (350 lb) bombs were carried under the outer wings.

During development the maximum speed was increased, but it still did not meet requirements. It had a complex and advanced structure which contributed to difficulties in producing a working prototype. The prototype MM.531 flew for the first time in October 1943 and logged over 21 hours of flight time.

In March 1944 it was mistaken for a P-38 Lightning and attacked by a Macchi C.205. The aircraft survived by performing evasive manoeuvres, but it was so badly damaged that it was grounded for months. The SM.92 was destroyed by Allied bombing in 1944.

Specifications (SM.92)

References

 Lembo, Daniele, I bifusoliera della Regia, Storia militare magazine, Westward editions, n.11, April–May 2000

External links

 SM.91 & SM.92

sm.092
Abandoned military aircraft projects of Italy
World War II Italian fighter aircraft
Savoia-Marchetti SM.92
Aircraft first flown in 1943
Mid-wing aircraft
1940s Italian fighter aircraft
Twin piston-engined tractor aircraft